The Electoral Law Amendment Act, 1958 (Act No. 30 of 1958) was an act of the Parliament of South Africa which reduced the voting age for white voters from 21 to 18. It did not reduce the voting age for black and coloured voters (under the Representation of Natives Act and the Separate Representation of Voters Act respectively) and hence had the effect of further reducing their (already limited) electoral power.

The act came into force on 15 September 1958. The next subsequent general election of the House of Assembly was held on 8 October 1961. The act took the form of a series of amendments to the Electoral Consolidation Act, 1946, and was therefore repealed on 1 February 1980 when that act was repealed and replaced by the Electoral Act, 1979.

References

Repealed South African legislation
1958 in South African law